Adolf August Hohneck (3 February 1810, Eibau - 2 February 1879, Oberlößnitz) was a German landscape painter, lithographer and graphic artist.

Biography 
He studied painting at  both the Dresden Academy of Fine Arts and the Kunstakademie Düsseldorf.

He was primarily known as a landscape painter, although he also did portraits. In 1844, he created a series of lithographs, depicting the Professors at the University of Bonn.

The Kupferstich-Kabinett, Dresden, and the Galerie Neue Meister have large collections of his lithographs and drawings.

He was married to Marie Julie, née Müller (1836–1904). They had one son and four daughters and lived in Radebeul.

His daughter, was also a graphic artist and illustrator of children's books.

References

Further reading 
 Frank Andert (Ed.): Stadtlexikon Radebeul. Historisches Handbuch für die Lößnitz. Stadtarchiv Radebeul. 2nd ed. 2006, .
 "Hohneck, Adolf". In: Hans Vollmer (Ed.): Allgemeines Lexikon der Bildenden Künstler von der Antike bis zur Gegenwart, Vol. 17: Heubel–Hubard. E. A. Seemann, Leipzig 1924, pps.318–319
 Hans Paffrath (Ed.): Lexikon der Düsseldorfer Malerschule'', Vol. 2. Bruckmann, Munich 1998, pps. 127–128, .

External links 

 More works by Hohneck @ ArtNet
 Search results for Adolf Hohneck @ the Deutsche Digitale Bibliothek 
 

1810 births
1879 deaths
19th-century German painters
19th-century German male artists
German landscape painters
German portrait painters
German lithographers
People from Görlitz (district)